Rayan Aribi (born July 29, 1987) is a Tunisian handball player. He was born in Hammamet.

Honours

Club
African Champions League
 Winner: 2010 Casablanca
 Runners-up: 2011 Kaduna
African Cup Winners' Cup
 Winner: 2012 Tunis
African Super Cup
 Runners-up: 2011 Yaoundé
Tunisian Handball League
 Winner: 2011
Tunisia National Cup
 Winner: 2010

Individual
 Best scorer in the 2013 Super Globe (35 goals).

References

1987 births
Living people
Tunisian male handball players